A Day with the Homies is the third extended play album by American recording artist Panda Bear (Noah Lennox), released on January 12, 2018 by the Domino Recording Company. It was released only on vinyl, and then to streaming services with a new digital mix on October 31, 2019.  Lennox played four of the five tracks live for the first time at the Desert Daze festival in Joshua Tree, California.

Track listing

Personnel
Credits adapted from the liner notes of A Day with the Homies.

 Noah Lennox – producer, mixer, artwork
 Chris Athens – mastering
 Rob Carmichael – artwork

References

2018 EPs
Domino Recording Company EPs
Panda Bear (musician) albums